Events from the year 1989 in Taiwan, Republic of China. This year is numbered Minguo 78 according to the official Republic of China calendar.

Incumbents
 President – Lee Teng-hui
 Vice President – vacant
 Premier – Yu Kuo-hwa, Lee Huan
 Vice Premier – Shih Chi-yang

Events

February
 3 February – The founding of Peasant Party.

March
 8 March – The establishment of EVA Air.
 23 March – The establishment of Taiwan Lighting Fixture Export Association.

July
 1 July – The establishment of National Chung Cheng University in Minxiong Township, Chiayi County.
 5 July – The opening of Fortune Junior College of Industry in Cishan Township, Kaohsiung County.
 8 July – The opening of Formosa Fun Coast in Bali Township, Taipei County.
 20 July – Government of the Republic of China establishes diplomatic relations with Grenada.

September
 10 September – The landfall of Typhoon Sarah.

October
 2 October – Government of the Republic of China resumes diplomatic relations with Liberia.
 13 October – Government of the Republic of China establishes diplomatic relations with Belize.
 26 October – The crash of China Airlines Flight 204 in Hualien County.

December
 3 December – 1989 Republic of China legislative election.

Births
 23 January – Yani Tseng, professional golfer
 28 April – Annie Chen, model and actress
 13 May – Chuang Chia-chia, taekwondo athlete
 11 August – Gui Gui, singer and actress
 17 August – Chan Yung-jan, tennis athlete
 26 August – Tan Wen-lin, football player
 23 October – Chan Che-Yuan, football athlete

References

 
Years of the 20th century in Taiwan